A list of works by the French composer Pierre Boulez.

Compositions

Published 
Douze Notations for piano (1945). 
Sonatine for flute et piano (1946; revised 1949).
Piano Sonata No. 1 (1946; revised 1949).
Le Visage nuptial for soprano, mezzo-soprano, chorus and orchestra (1946; revised 1951; revised 1988–89)
Piano Sonata No. 2 (1948)
Sonata for Two Pianos (1948); revision of the quartet for Ondes Martenot; withdrawn
Livre pour quatuor (1948, revised 2011–12); two movements were reworked for string orchestra as Livre pour cordes (1968; revised 1989)
Le Soleil des eaux for soprano, chorus and orchestra (1948; revised 1950; revised 1958; revised 1965); text: 2 poems by René Char
Deux Études, musique concrète (1951–52)
Structures I for two pianos (1951–52)
Le Marteau sans maître for alto voice and six instruments (1953–55; revised 1957)
La Symphonie mécanique musique concrète for a film by Jean Mitry (1955)
L'Orestie incidental music for Aeschylus' trilogy the Oresteia, for voice and instrumental ensemble (1955)
Piano Sonata No. 3 (1955–57/63); unfinished
Le Crépuscule de Yang Koueï-Fei musique concrète for the radiophonic play by Louise Fauré (1957)
Pli selon pli for soprano and orchestra (1957–58, as Improvisations sur Mallarmé I and II; completed 1959–62; revised 1983; revised 1989)
Structures II for two pianos (1961)
Figures—Doubles—Prismes for orchestra (1957–58, as Doubles; revised 1964; revised 1968)
Éclat for ensemble (1965)
Domaines for clarinet (1968)
Domaines for clarinet and six instrumental groups (1968)
Improvisé—pour le Dr. Kalmus for flute, clarinet, piano, violin, and cello (1969; revised 2005)
Cummings ist der Dichter for chorus and ensemble (1970; revised 1986)
Rituel – in memoriam Bruno Maderna for orchestra in eight groups (1974)
Ainsi parla Zarathoustra incidental music for voice and ensemble (1974)
Messagesquisse for solo cello and six cellos (1976)
Répons for two pianos, harp, vibraphone, xylophone, cimbalom, ensemble and live electronics (1980; revised and expanded 1982; revised and expanded 1984)
Dérive 1 for six instruments (1984)
Dialogue de l'ombre double for clarinet and electronics (1985)
Mémoriale (…explosante-fixe… originel) for flute and ensemble (1985); an arrangement of the central section from the withdrawn work ...explosante-fixe...
Initiale for brass ensemble (1987)
Dérive 2 for eleven instruments (1988; revised 2002; expanded and completed 2006)
Anthèmes for violin (1991; revised and expanded 1994)
Fanfare for the 80th Birthday of Georg Solti for brass and percussion (1992; originally titled Dérive 3)
…explosante-fixe… for solo MIDI flute, two "shadow" flutes, chamber orchestra, and electronics (1991–93); three of nine projected movements
Incises for piano (1994; revised and expanded 2001)
Anthèmes II for violin and live electronics (1997)
sur Incises for three pianos, three harps and three percussionists (1996–98)
Une page d’éphéméride for piano (2005)

Unpublished 
Nocturne for piano (1944–45), unpublished.
Prélude, toccata et scherzo for piano (1944–45), unpublished.
Trois Psalmodies for piano (1945); unpublished, withdrawn.
Thème et variations for piano, left hand (1945); unpublished.
Quatuor pour quatre ondes Martenot (Quartet for four ondes Martenot) (1945–46), unpublished.
Onze Notations (1946); arrangement for chamber ensemble of eleven of the Douze notations, unpublished.
Symphonie concertante for piano and orchestra (1947); lost
Polyphonie X for ensemble (1950–51); withdrawn
Oubli signal lapidé for 12 solo voices (1952); withdrawn
Poésie pour pouvoir for tape and 3 orchestras (1955/58); withdrawn
Strophes for flute (1957); unfinished
Éclat/multiples (1970); Éclat followed by a longer piece for a larger ensemble; unfinished
…explosante-fixe… for flute, clarinet, and trumpet (1971–72); withdrawn
…explosante-fixe… new version for flute, clarinet, trumpet, harp, vibraphone, violin, viola, cello, and electronics (1973–74); withdrawn
…explosante-fixe… version for vibraphone and electronics (1986); withdrawn

Revisions of previous works 
Livre pour cordes (1968; revised 1989); revision of Livre pour quatuor (1948)
Notations I–IV and VII for orchestra (1978–1984/1997)
Dialogue de l'ombre double (transcribed for bassoon and electronics, 1985/1995)
Dialogue de l'ombre double (authorized transcription for recorder by Erik Bosgraaf, 2014)

Sources

 Campbell, Edward, and Peter O'Hagan. 2016. Pierre Boulez Studies. Cambridge: Cambridge University Press. , pp. 25–55.
 Goldman, Jonathan. 2011. The Musical Language of Pierre Boulez. Cambridge: Cambridge University Press. , pp. 215–217.
 Griffiths, Paul. 1978. Boulez (Oxford Studies of Composers). London: Oxford University Press. , pp. 62–63.
 Hopkins, G. W., and Paul Griffiths. 2011. "Boulez, Pierre", Grove Music Online, ed. Deane Root (accessed 6 January 2016). (Subscription access)
 Samuel, Claude (ed.). 2002. Eclats 2002. Paris: Mémoire du Livre. , .

Boulez, Pierre, compositions by